John William Tebbel (1912–2004), was an American journalist, editor, writer, teacher, and media historian. He was known for his four volume book, A History of Book Publishing in the United States (Bowker).

Biography 
John William Tebbel was born on November 16, 1912, in Boyne City, Michigan to parents Edna Mae (née Johnston) and William Tebbel. He grew up on a farm and began working as a local reporter for the Mount Pleasant Daily Times newspaper in Michigan when he was age 14. Tebbel attended Mount Pleasant High School, graduating in the class of 1931. He received a bachelor's degree (1935) from Central Michigan University; and a master's degree (1937) from Columbia Journalism School.

After graduation, Tebbel served as a reporter for the Detroit Free Press; an editor of The Providence Journal; and managing editor of the American Mercury. In 1943, he joined the editorial team for the Sunday edition of The New York Times.

Tebbel wrote several books about indigenous people of North America. He taught journalism coursework at his alma mater, Columbia Journalism School; and at New York University (NYU) from 1949 to 1976.

Tebbel died on October 10, 2004, in Durham, North Carolina. He was survived by his wife Kathryn Carl and their daughter.

Publications

References

External links 
 John William Tebbel papers, Archives at Yale, Sterling Memorial Library

1912 births
2004 deaths
American newspaper editors
American newspaper journalists
People from Boyne City, Michigan
People from Mount Pleasant, Michigan
Central Michigan University alumni
Columbia University Graduate School of Journalism alumni
Columbia University Graduate School of Journalism faculty
New York University faculty
The New York Times editors
Media historians